TEOCO is a privately held telecom software vendor based in Fairfax, Virginia, in the United States.

History
TEOCO was founded in 1995 and is based in Fairfax, Virginia. The company's name is an acronym derived from 'The Employee Owned Company.' It has grown through acquisition, which has enabled it to add new solutions to its portfolio, as well as new customers and territories. In October 2009, TA Associates completed a $60 Million minority investment in TEOCO. In 2014 it employed 1,300 people and had revenues of approximately $175 million.

Acquisitions

 2002  Respond Networks, a provider of lead management solutions
 2008  Vero Systems, a margin management and Least-cost routing solutions vendor
 2010  TTI for $58 million
 2013  Aircom, a provider of network design and optimization software and solutions
 2017  CETECOM's US Mobile Communications Testing Services (CTS MC) subsidiary
 2017  PreClarity, a provider of data processing and analytics solutions
 2019  CIQUAL Limited, a vendor of quality of experience (QoE) solutions

Products
TEOCO provides invoice business process outsourcing, consultancy, cloud, and support services.

In February 2020, TEOCO announced HELIX 11, the latest version of its service assurance platform.

Business Solutions
TEOCO's Business Solutions are a range of analytics solutions. The products are focused either on the network or the device and include:
 Analytics Platform
 Financial Analytics
 Cost management
 Business Services Revenue assurance
 Routing Management
 MVNO Analytics
 Trunk and Circuit Analytics
 On-device Analytics 
 Digital Analytics

RAN Solutions
TEOCO's RAN Solutions address planning and configuration, optimisation and analytics. These tools help communications service providers maintain quality of service (QoS) and reduce CAPEX.
 Network Planning
 Network Optimization
 Network Services
 Configuration Management
 Drone Connectivity
 Network Analytics

Service Assurance
TEOCO's Service Assurance Solutions cover performance, fault and service management and include:
 Fault Management
 Performance Management
 Service Management
 Service Assurance Analytics
 Fault Analytics as a Service (FaaST)
 NOC/SOC Solutions

TEOCO in the News
In 2008, Razorsight, a revenue and cost optimization vendor was ordered to pay TEOCO $4.5 million for stealing TEOCO's intellectual property. 

TEOCO was involved in the Iowa Utilities Board and subsequent FCC ruling in Qwest communication's Traffic pumping case. TEOCO, a supplier to Qwest of cost and revenue management solutions, used its technology to capture and analyze five years of call detail records to help solidify the case and determine damages.

References

Software companies of the United States